Grenada National Stadium is a multi-purpose stadium in St. George's, Grenada. It is currently used mostly for football matches.  The stadium holds 8,000 people.

It was renamed to Kirani James Athletic Stadium in April 2017, in honour of the first olympic medallist of Grenada, Kirani James.

Uses 
The stadium hosted six games in the 2016 CONCACAF Women's U-17 Championship.

It is home to the Grenada national football team.

References

Football venues in Grenada
Athletics (track and field) venues in Grenada
Multi-purpose stadiums
National stadiums
Buildings and structures in St. George's, Grenada